Melkari Rural District is in Vazineh District of Sardasht County, West Azerbaijan province, Iran. At the National Census of 2006, its population was 16,185 in 2,841 households. There were 15,545 inhabitants in 4,045 households at the following census of 2011. At the most recent census of 2016, the population of the rural district was 16,301 in 4,045 households. The largest of its 62 villages was Nalas, with 8,503 people.

References 

Sardasht County

Rural Districts of West Azerbaijan Province

Populated places in West Azerbaijan Province

Populated places in Sardasht County